Sister is the fourth studio album by American alternative rock band Sonic Youth. It was released in June 1987 by SST Records. The album furthered the band's move away from the no wave genre towards more traditional song structures, while maintaining an aggressively experimental approach.

Like Sonic Youth's previous records, Sister was not successful at the time of its release. In the years following, however, it received much critical praise, with several publications naming it as one of the best albums of the 1980s.

Background and recording 
Sonic Youth released their third album, EVOL, in May 1986. During the tour of the album, the band began writing material for a new album ("White Kross" had been written earlier, circa May 1986). Sister was recorded to 16-track in March and April 1987 with Walter Sear at Sear Sound, entirely on analog tube equipment, giving it its characteristic "warm", vintage feel.

Sister is a loose concept album (like its follow-up Daydream Nation). Sister was in part inspired by the life and works of science fiction writer Philip K. Dick. The original titles for the album were Kitty Magic, Humpy Pumpy and Sol-Fuc, but it was named Sister as a reference to Dick's fraternal twin, who died shortly after her birth, and whose memory haunted Dick his entire life. "Sister" was also the original title for "Schizophrenia", and Thurston Moore often introduced it as "Sister".

Music and lyrics 
According to Sputnikmusic's Adam Downer, Sister deviated from the frenetic sound of Sonic Youth's previous music in favor of a refined style of noise pop that would typify the band's subsequent work. The album features aggressive noise songs such as "White Kross" and "Catholic Block", as well as a menacing noir ode, "Pacific Coast Highway", although it also featured more traditional song structures. Some of the lyrics on "Schizophrenia" were originally written for early song "Come Around" ("Your future is static, It's already had it/But I got a hunch, it's coming back to me"). "Sister" was the original title for "Schizophrenia", and a live recording of the song from June 4, 1987 at The Town and Country Club in London was released on the B-side of a bootleg 7" single under the title "Sister". The A-side featured their cover of "I Wanna Be Your Dog" with Iggy Pop. Both tracks from the single were later issued on the DVD portion of Screaming Fields of Sonic Love.

The band used acoustic guitars on some songs on the album for "melodic" purposes, one of the first being "(I Got A) Catholic Block". Another was "Beauty Lies in the Eye", which used three or four guitars. "Pipeline/Kill Time", sung by Ranaldo, was written on April 5, 1987, although several lyrics were not included in the final song. "Tuff Gnarl"'s working titles were "Sea-Sik" and "Smart and Fast", but the band ultimately decided to call it "Tuff Gnarl", inspired by the line "He's running on a tuff gnarl in his head". Mike Watt covered the song on his album Ball-Hog or Tugboat? with Sonic Youth members Moore, Ranaldo and Steve Shelley performing it with him. For the eighth song on the album, the band covered Crime's song "Hot Wire My Heart". "Kotton Krown" (or "Cotton Crown") was the first Gordon and Moore duet, although Moore usually sang it alone during live performances. The last song on the album, "White Kross", was the oldest song on the album and was featured on an NME 7". On the band's 1987 European tour, they extended the song, adding five or six minutes of white noise at the end; this coda was later named "Broken Eye".

Packaging 
The artwork of the original front cover contained a photograph of 12-year-old Sandra Bennett, taken by Richard Avedon on August 23, 1980, but it was censored for later releases after a threat of a lawsuit. At first the picture was merely covered up with a black sticker, but on later pressings it was removed, only showing a black area. Similarly, a photo of Disney's Magic Kingdom on the back cover was later obscured by a Universal Product Code. Very early promotional posters and pressings of the album did feature these photos, but later ones did not.

A unique feature of the packaging is that the band is named as "The Sonic Youth" in the cover art.

Release and promotion 
Sister was released in June 1987 by SST (USA) and Blast First (UK) on vinyl, CD and cassette. After its release, the band began their European tour, during which a part of the Master=Dik EP was recorded at a radio session in Geneva. They toured the USA in September and October, replacing their usual encores of "Hot Wire My Heart" and "I Wanna Be Your Dog" with four Ramones cover versions. A recording of a concert the band played on October 14 in Chicago was officially released as Hold That Tiger.

Videos were shot for "Beauty Lies in the Eye" and "Stereo Sanctity". The black-and-white "Stereo Sanctity" video, featuring clips of whirring factory machinery and brief live shots of the band, can only be seen on a rare 1980s SST video compilation titled Over 35 Videos Never Before Released. The band did not release an official single from the album.

Critical reception 

In a contemporary review for The Village Voice, music critic Robert Christgau called Sister an album that was finally worthy of the band's aesthetic. Christgau said that while Sonic Youth had learned to temper their penchant for "insanity", their guitar sound was still "almost unique in its capacity to evoke rock and roll without implicating them in a history few youngish bands can bear up under these days". In a negative review, Spin magazine said that the band failed to successfully mix their previous "nonsense" with "real rock tunage", as the more tempered musical approach lacked riffs and strong ideas. The album was voted the 12th best album of the year in The Village Voices annual Pazz & Jop critics poll for 1987. Christgau, the poll's creator, ranked it fifth on his own list. The album ranked No. 4 among "Albums of the Year" for 1987 in the annual NME critics' poll.

In a retrospective review, AllMusic editor Stephen Thomas Erlewine called Sister "a masterpiece" and "one of the singular art rock records of the 1980s, surpassed only by Sonic Youth's next album, Daydream Nation". Slant Magazine called it "the last great punk album of the Reagan era, and the first great pop album to emerge from the American underground", while listing it as the 72nd best album of the 1980s. Pitchfork ranked Sister as the 14th best album of the 1980s. NME rated it No. 80 in their list of the greatest albums ever, and No. 37 in their list of the 50 greatest albums of the 1980s. In July 1995, Alternative Press magazine voted Sister the third best album of the decade spanning 1985–1995. Paste magazine's Josh Jackson listed the album at No. 39 on his list of "The 50 Best Post-Punk Albums", saying, "While the following year's Daydream Nation may be their indie-rock masterpiece, the weirder, more muscular Sister exemplifies everything great about post-punk music."

Track listing

Personnel 
Sonic Youth

 Thurston Moore – guitar (tracks 1, 2 and 4–10), vocals, Moog synthesizer (5), bass guitar (3), production
 Kim Gordon – bass guitar (tracks 1, 2 and 4–10), vocals, production
 Lee Ranaldo – guitar, vocals, production
 Steve Shelley – drums, production

Technical
 Bill Titus – engineering
 Howie Weinberg – mastering
 Walter Sear – Moog programming
 Lucius Shepard – sleeve illustration

Release history

Notes

References

External links 
 
 Sister (Adobe Flash) at Radio3Net (streamed copy where licensed)

1987 albums
Sonic Youth albums
SST Records albums
DGC Records albums
Blast First albums
Au Go Go Records albums
Flying Nun Records albums
Noise pop albums